Alfredo Da Silva (February 20, 1935 – January 26, 2020) was a painter, graphic artist, and photographer, known for his abstract expressionism. He came to international prominence in 1959 and remained so until his death in 2020.

Biography 

Alfredo Da Silva was born February 20, 1935, during the end of an inconclusive Chaco War between Bolivia and Paraguay. In 1938 a peace treaty was signed in Buenos Aires between Paraguay and Bolivia. After Chaco War, Bolivia was struggling to find some form of Democracy for the indigenous Indians that made up a large demographic. Many political parties tried to take power. Violent coups and counter-revolutions followed, but in 1952 Victor Paz Estenssoro left-wing Movimiento Nacionalista Revolucionario the MNR succeeds in seizing power. "Alfredo Da Silva was almost unknown in his own country until he went abroad and won the highest award for a foreign artist at the 1959 National Salon in Buenos Aires". In 1960 he was discovered by José Gómez-Sicre who at the time was chief of the Division of Visual Arts for the Pan American Union now called the Organization of American States or OAS for short. In 1961 José Gómez-Sicre invited him to have a one-man show at the Pan American Union Gallery in Washington D.C organized by the Organization of American States. He was close friends with a celebrated Bolivian sculptor Marina Núñez del Prado who wrote about him in her book "Eternidad en Los Andes". He is recognized as one of the historical "generation of 52" by The National Art Museum (MNA). The generation of 52 is marked by the Bolivian National Revolution which occurred on April 9, 1952. The generation of 52 had two main artistic trends, the "social painters" and the "abstract painters". Alfredo was part of the movement of abstract painters that did not accept social realism as the only mode for artistic expression. According to Babs Myer from the "Times of Brazil" "Accepting "abstract expressionism" as the label most nearly describing his art, da Silva works from a base of "intuition creation," expressing a world of intuition with rational shapes. He fuses the ancient past with the far distant future and creates a sense of time itself moving to the future or to the past, but always of one continuous whole. The circle, is always evident, and one may recognize ancient Indian building stones, fossilized bones, or structures for man's use in some misty future in space". Later in 1981 his abstract work is recognized by Teresa Gisbert (Director of the institute of Bolivian Studies at the University of San Andres in La Paz, Bolivia), she described his work as "Outstanding for his treatment of surface qualities and his abstractionism".

On Sunday, January 26, 2020, Da Silva was struck and killed by a vehicle while crossing the street near his home in Alexandria, Virginia.

Background and academic career

He studied at the Potosí Academy of Fine Arts University Tomas Frias and the Prilidiano Pueyredon Academy of Fine Arts in Buenos Aires where, in 1958, he obtained his degree as teacher of drawing and painting. In 1962, he won a grant to study graphic Arts at the Pratt Institute of New York.

Art career

Alfredo Da Silva had his first show in 1951 at age 16. In 1959, he won first prize in a competition for foreign artists at the Salon National of Painting in Buenos Aires. In 1961 he was invited to have a one-man show at the Pan American Union in Washington, D.C.; that same year he represented the Pan American Union at the Biennial of São Paulo. In 1962, he won a grant to study graphic Arts at the Pratt Institute of New York. In 1963, the Institute of Spanish Culture in Madrid invited him to participate in the exhibition of "Art of America and Spain ;" that same year he was awarded a fellowship by the Guggenheim Foundation for the period of 1963–1964. In 1964, he was invited to participate at the II American Biennale of Cordoba, Argentina, where he won 3rd prize. In 1977 participated at II Biennale of Bolivia INBO, where he won grand prize. In 1980 he was invited to the II Biennale Iberoamericana of Art in Mexico where he had a show.

Early years 1943 – 1950
At the age eight Alfredo saw his brother Hugo Silva's art who was studying in the local school of fine art and with a competitive spirit was motivated to do better. During  this period he drew pencil sketches of still life and landscapes. Pencil was the only utensil he could afford until he went to school in 1951.

Growth 1951 – 1962 
In 1951 he enrolled into the Potosí Academy of Fine Arts, Arts university Tomas Frias. Where he studied drawing, painting, sculpture, and graphic arts. Then in 1958 he went to the Prilidiano Pueyredon Academy of Fine art in Buenos Aires where, in December of that same year, he obtained his degree as teacher of drawing and painting. In 1962, he won a grant to study graphic Arts at the Pratt Institute of New York.

Maturity 1959 – 1980 
In 1959 he won the highest award for a foreign artist at the National Salon in Buenos Aires. "Just two years later he was awarded a Pan American Fellowship in Washington, D.C., where he was given a one-man show and then invited to represent the Pan American Union at the Biennale of San Paulo".

"During the 1960s, he continued to amass honors, including his Guggenheim Fellowship and a Pratt Graphic Center Grant, as his artwork attracted ever increasing attention and plaudits.  Since then, he has participated in dozens of group exhibitions at such prominent venues as the Museum of Fine Arts, Mexico; the Contemporary Art Museum of Dallas, Texas; the Museum of Fine Arts in Helsinki, Finland; the gallery of the Central University of Caracas, Venezuela; the Institute of Contemporary Art in London; the Museum of Aberdeen, Scotland; and the Cultural Center of Villa Madrid, Spain.  His work has also been exhibited in numerous one-man shows throughout North and South America and Europe and is in the permanent collections of the Coin Museum of Potosi, Bolivia; the National Museum of La Paz; the Metropolitan Museum of New York; and the Museum of Modern Art in Rio de Janeiro; to name just a few of the public collections that boast his works.  His many prizes include the Grand Prize at the II Biennale INBO in La Paz in 1977".

Present – 1980–
Between 1974 -1976 he worked for ABC TV American Broadcasting CO., 1257 54St. New York
Graphic Designer : illustrations for Storyboards, Slide
Presentations, Covers, Jackets, Mechanical Brochures.
Working with picture department to develop illustrations.

Between 1981 and 1986 he worked for U.S. News & World Report, 2400 N st., NW. Washington DC.
Graphic Designer: Responsible for designing Supplements
for U.S. News Magazine from inception through completion.
Complete charge designing Direct Mail Promotion material,
Brochures~, Booklets, Ads for Magazines & Newspapers.
Conceptual abilities, produce quality comps, general production
of mechanicals, select and evaluate photographs.
Excellent typography, Experienced in Illustrations and
Photography & dark room photo lab. Enjoys working on
team projects and meeting deadlines.

Between 1987 and 1988 he worked for The World & I, Washington Times Publication.
2850; New York Ave. Ne. Washington, D.C.
Art Director: Responsible for the overall look of the
Magazine, support with the conceptual design & production
for all graphic materials, coordinate the Art department
activities with the editorial & production depts.
Photo directing and select, evaluate photographs, Illustrations
for the cover magazine and page design for special
reports, assign work to Illustrators & Photographers.

Between 1988–present he worked for HJB Associates, 2228 South Quincy St. Arlington, VA.
Part-time AS St. 1ITt Director: Design and production of
Corporate Identity, Direct-I.1ail Catalogs, Brochures,
Fliers, Annual Reports and Slide Presentations.

On May 21, 2005, he was a judge for the Congressional Art Competition "An Artistic Discovery" in Washington Dc.

Between  March 16 and May 17, 2009, his art was part of an exhibit presented at the Museo de Antioquia, in Medellín, Colombia, on occasion of the 50th Anniversary of the Inter-American Development Bank, and the celebration of the 50th Annual Meeting of Governors of the IDB. An exhibition gathering paintings, drawings and engravings by some of the most important Latin American and Caribbean 20th-century artists, drawn from the collections of the Inter-American Development Bank and the Organization of American States, in Washington, D.C.

On January 26, 2020, Alfredo was struck and killed by a car in Alexandria, VA in what is believed to have been an accident.

Comments by critics and notable artists
 In the book Art in Latin America Today "Bolivia" art critic Rigoberto Villarroel Claure says "Alfredo Da Silva was almost unknown in his own country until he went abroad and won the highest award for a foreign artist at the 1959 National Salon in Buenos Aires".
 In a Cable address on October 26, 1966, Dr. José Gómez-Sicre said "In my judgment, Alfredo Da Silva  is highly talented as both a painter and graphic artist, and there is no doubt that he can be considered among the best professional artists in his fields in Latin America".
 In the book "Latin-American Painters in New York" Ernesto Ramallo (professor and art critic), from Buenos Aires, Argentina Describes Alfredo Da Silva and his work. "He is very young. His 24 years almost conflict with the maturity his work shows. We are far from thinking that painting well is a matter of more or less time, but still it is surprising to find him so mature. His works have everything, but everything in coherence, in unity. It is suggestive, yes, but it suggests the deep: there is nothing superficial or epidermic".
 Celebrated Bolivian sculptor Marina Núñez del Prado describes his work in her book "Eternidad en Los Andes" "His work is abstract and gets us thinking in Tiawanaqu. He has all the telluric force and mysterious strength of the andian nature".
 Artist, art critic, and cultural manager, Felix Angel describes his work in the catalog "50 years 50 works" "His production, based on a repertory of forms that alternate between the geometric and the organic, has always been rich in meaning. He has never been able to banish completely from his mind the hallucinatory images of the Valley of the Moon near La Paz, as attested in his work by the mineral-like sharpness of the draftsmanship and the labyrinthine intricacy of the total composition".

Style and influences 

His early works were painted using vibrant colors. Growing up in Bolivia he was influenced by the Inca civilization. In 1958 he went to Buenos Aires and became very interested in his textural expressionism. Color wise his paintings were more monochromatic. He also spent a great deal more focus on texture and composition. In 1960 he started to receive invitations to have shows all over the world and his paintings began to grow in size and in detail.

Shows, prizes, and collections

One-man shows in Bolivia 

 1951 Bibloioteca de La Paz, Bolivia.
 1952 University of Tomas Frias, Bolivia.
 1953 San Francisco Xavier University, Sucre, Bolivia.
 1954 Salon of Tarija, Bolivia.
 1955 Salon of the city of Oruro, Bolivia.
 1955 Salon of Cochabamba, Bolivia.
 1955 Salon of the city of La Paz, Bolivia.
 1857 National Museum of Potosi, Bolivia.

One man shows in other countries 
 1954 Valparaiso, Chile.
 1955 Lima, Peru.
 1955 Rio Janeiro, Brazil.
 1957 Jocky club, Cordoba, Argentina.
 1957 Union Artist Gallery, Buenos Aires, Argentina.
 1958  Buenos Aires, Gallery, Argentina.
 1960 Punta del Este, Gallery, Uruguay.
 1960 Peuser gallery, Buenos Aires, Argentina.
 1961 Pan American Union Gallery, Washington, D.C.
 1961 Henrri gallery, Alexandria, Virginia.

Group shows 
 1955 Latin American Exhibition, U.S.A.
 1962 Columbus Museum of Art and Graphics, Georgia.
 1962 Latin American Art Festival, U.S. A
 1963 El Arte actual de America en Europa. Madrid, Espana.

Prizes 
 1954 First Prize School of Fine Arts Potosi, Bolivia.
 1955 First Prize, Salon of the City of Potosi, Bolivia.
 1956 Honorary Mention at the Academy of Fine Arts, Potosi, Bolivia.
 1956 Acquisition Prize Salon of the City of La Paz, Bolivia.
 1957, First Prize, JockeyClub, Cordoba, Argentina.
 1959 First Prize Foreign Artists Salon National of the Fine Arts School of Buenos Aires, Argentina.
 1962 Prize, Academy of Fine Arts, Barranquilla, Colombia.
 1964, 3rd Prize, II American Biennale of Cordoba, Argentina.
 1966, Acquisition Prize, Everson Museum, Syracuse
 1970, 2nd Prize, Chrysler Festival, Provincetown, Massachusetts.
 1977, Grand Prize, II Biennale INBO, La Paz.

Museum and private collections 

 Museum of Potosi, Bolivia.
 Museum of Modern Art, Buenos Aires, Argentina.
 Private Collection Ignacio Ibarra, Portugal and Spain
 1959 National Salon of Fine Arts, Buenos Aires, Argentina.
 1959 Agrupacion Arte No Figurativo, Buenos Aires, Argentina.
 1960 Sociedad Ver y Estimar, Buenos Aires, Argentina.
 1960 First International Art Exhibition, Buenos Aires, Argentina.
 1961 National Museum of Fine Arts, Buenos Aires, Argentina.
 1961 Museum of Modern Arts, Rio de Janeiro, Brasil.
 1961 Special Invitation Sixth Biennalof São Paulo, Brasil in the Pan American Union Representation.
 1961 First Interamerican Contemporary of Art Hall Gallery, Washington, D.C.
 1961 Latin American Art, Atlantic City Electric Company.
 1962 Latin American Art Duke University, Washington, D.C.
 1962 Latin American Art Foxcroft School, Virginia.

Family
 Father: Napoleon Silva Rodriguez
 Mother: Florencia Condori
 Brothers: Juvenal, Hugo, David
 Sisters: Tereza, Rosa
 Son: Lorenzo Da Silva

Grants 

 1961, Pan American Fellowship, Washington, D.C.
 1963, Guggenheim Fellowship, New York.
 1964, Pratt GraphicCenter Grant, New York. Prizes:

Public collections 

 Coin Museum of Potosí, Bolivia
 National Museum, La Paz, Bolivia
 Museum of Modern Art, Caracas, Venezuela
 Museum of Modern Art, Staten Island, New York
 Museum of Modern Art of Latin America, Washington, D.C.
 Permanent Collection, Hartford Foundation, New York.
 Institute of Spanish Culture, Madrid, Spain.
 Guggenheim Collection, New York.
 Permanent Collection, Kaiser, Argentina
 Museum of Fine Arts and Modern Art, Toledo, Spain.
 Museum of Modern Art, New York.
 Bolivian Embassy, Moscow, Russia.
 Metropolitan Museum, New York.
 Center of Interamerican Relations, New York.
 Everson Museum, Syracuse, New York.
 Museum of Modern Art, Lima, Peru.
 Museum of Modern Art, Rio, Brazil,
 Museum of University of Texas.
 Interamerican Bank, Washington, D.C.

Individual exhibitions 

 1951, Municipal Gallery, La Paz, Bolivia.
 1952, Fine Arts Academy, Potosí, Bolivia.
 1954, San Francisco University, Sucre,  Bolivia.
 1954,  Academy of Fine Arts, Potosi, Bolivia.
 1955, Technical University, Oruro, Bolivia.
 1957, Coin Museum of Potosí, Bolivia.
 1957, Jockey Club Gallery, Cordoba,
 1957, Argentina. Society of Plastic Arts Gallery, Buenos Aires.
 1959, Art Bella Gallery, Montevideo, Uruguay.
 1959,  Gallery Galatea, Buenos Aires.
 1960, Museum of Modern Art, Buenos Aires.
 1960,  Punta del Este Gallery, Uruguay.
 1961, Pan American Union Gallery, Washington, D.C.
 1962, Henri Gallery, Alexandria.
 1963, Royal Athenea Gallery, New York.
 1964, Pan American Union Gallery, Washington, D.C.
 1964, San Fidele Gallery, Milan.
 1965, Obelic Gallery, Buenos Aires.
 1967, Contemporary Institute, Lima, Peru.
 1967,  Libano Gallery, Libano.
 1970, French Institute, New York.
 1971, Montreal Art Center, Montreal.
 1974, Royal Athenea Gallery, New York.
 1974, American Federation, New York.
 1977, Museum of Modern Art, Rio, Brazil.
 1977, Museum of Fine Arts, Rio, Brazil.
 1977, Casa Blanca Gallery, Rio.
 1978, Kenako Gallery, La Paz, Bolivia.
 1979, Emusa Gallery, La Paz, Bolivia.
 1980, Franz Bader Gallery, Washington, D.C.

Collective exhibitions 
 1956, Municipal Gallery, La Paz, Bolivia.
 1958, Museum of Fine Arts, Buenos Aires.
 1959, National Gallery of Painting, Buenos Aires.
 1959, Peuser Gallery, Buenos Aires.
 1960, Van Riel Gallery, Buenos Aires.
 1960, Arte Contemporaneo, Museum of Modern Art, Buenos Aires.
 1961, Museum of Fine Arts, Buenos Aires.
 1961, Prize "Ver y Estimar," Van Riel Gallery, Buenos Aires.
 1961, Museum of Fine Arts, Rio, Brazil.
 1962, Museum of Modern Art, São Paulo, Brazil.
 1962, Latin American Art, Atlantic City
 1962, Contemporary Art, Duke University, New Orleans.
 1962, Latin American Art, Museum of Fine Arts, Mexico.
 1963, Latin American Art, Columbus Museum of Art, Georgia.
 1963, American Art of Spain, Madrid, Rome, Berlin, Bilbao, Paris.
 1963, Contemporary Art, Museum of Dallas, Texas.
 1964, International Gallery, New York.
 1964, Art Contemporary Gallery, Washington, D.C.
 1964, Magnet, Bonino Gallery, New York, Texas, Mexico.
 1964, II Biennale of  America, Cordoba, Argentina.
 1965, New personalities, Pepsi-Cola, New York.
 1965, Latin American Art, Berlin.
 1965, Contemporary Art Sutton Place, Baltimore.
 1966, Latin American Art, Museum of Modern Art, Paris.
 1966, "New Art," Museum of Modern Art, Buenos Aires.
 1967, "20 South American Artists," Mexico, Oakland, Oregon, California.
 1967, "Painters of South America," Museum of Fine Arts, Helsinki, Finlandia.
 1967, "Ruben Dario competition", Nicaragua.
 1967, Latin American Art, Central University, Caracas, Venezuela.
 1968, American Federation of Arts, New York.
 1968, Jewish Museum, New York.
 1968, Obelic Gallery, Buenos Aires.
 1968, Maya Gallery, Bruxelas.
 1969, International Festival, Montargis.
 1969, Museum of Modern Art, São Paulo, Brazil.
 1969, Contemporary Art, San Francisco.
 1969, Institute of Art, New Haven.
 1970, Mexico University Museum.
 1970, Institute of Contemporary Art, London.
 1970, Avant Garde Latin American Artists, Roma.
 1973, Contemporary Painting of Bolivia, Museum of Modern Art, Paris.
 1973, Virreinal Palace, Barcelona.
 1974, Montreal Art Center.
 1974, Contemporary Painting of Bolivia, Museum National, La Paz, Bolivia.
 1974, Museum of Modern Art, Estocolmo.
 1975, Museum of Abendeen, Escocia.
 1975, Cambridge University, London.
 1975, Museum of Modern Art, Minneapolis.
 1975, I Biennale INBO, La Paz, Bolivia.
 1976, Yale University.
 1977, Actual Art of Iberoamerica, Cultural Center of Villa Madrid.
 1977, II Biennale INBO, La Paz.
 1978, Modern Artists Gallery, Wicteom, Buenos Aires.
 1979, Museum National, La Paz.
 1979, Documenta Gallery, São Paulo, Brazil.
 1979, Imaginar Gallery, Bogota, Colombia.

References

Web

Journal

Books 
 
 Shows pan American union 1961, some biographical info, and painting and critic reviews
 
 Contains some biographical info, painting, and critic reviews
 
 Shows some biographical info and 1 painting
 
 Shows art work and artist
 
 Shows Art work and Artist
 
 Positive written views of Artist
 
 Shows art work and artist
 
 all about the Bolivian national revolution
 
 Shows one art work and recognizes him as one of the 50 greatest Latin American artists. with comments by Felix Angel

Newspaper 
 
 Contains=Shows full 2 page article in color with Art work and Artist recognition
 
 Contains=Shows Awards picture and artist
 
 connects Dr. Sicre and defines Alfredos art

External links 
 John Simon Guggenheim Foundation Fellows
 International delegates consider audio technology
 José Gómez-Sicre Papers, 1916–1991
 Generation of 52
 The Smithsonian Libraries Collections
 The Getty "union list of artists names"
 Bolivia: general information

20th-century Bolivian male artists
21st-century Bolivian male artists
1935 births
2020 deaths